Diabrotica undecimpunctata, the spotted cucumber beetle or southern corn rootworm, is a species of cucumber beetle that is native to North America. The species can be a major agricultural pest insect in North America. Spotted cucumber beetles cause damage to crops in the larval and adult stages of their life cycle.  Larvae feed on the roots of the emerging plants, which causes the most damage since the young plants are more vulnerable. In the adult stage the beetles cause damage by eating the flowers, leaves, stems, and fruits of the plant The beetles can also spread diseases such as bacterial wilt and mosaic virus.

Description
The spotted cucumber beetle has three subspecies, each with a different common name:

Diabrotica undecimpunctata howardi – spotted cucumber beetle or southern corn rootworm
Diabrotica undecimpunctata tenella – western cucumber beetle
Diabrotica undecimpunctata undecimpunctata – western spotted cucumber beetle

In the adult form, it eats leaves of many crops, including squash, cucumbers, soybeans, cotton, beans, and corn. Adult beetles lay eggs in the soil near a cucurbit plant.  The eggs hatch around mid spring and take 6–9 days to hatch under favorable conditions. The larval stage lasts around 2–3 weeks and the larvae are yellowish and wormlike. After the larval stage insects become pupae, this stage lasts for 6–10 days.  After 6–10 days the adult beetle emerges.  Adult beetles are greenish-yellow with six large black spots on each elytron. They are about 0.5 cm long.

Distribution 
This species is found throughout southern Canada, the continental USA, and the central highlands of Mexico.

References

External links 

Agricultural pest insects
Beetles of North America
Galerucinae